Mizin may refer to:
Serhiy Mizin (born 1972), Ukrainian footballer
Mizin, Iran (disambiguation), places in Iran